Inhume is a Dutch deathgrind band formed in 1994. The band has featured a revolving line-up throughout their career, with guitarist Ben Janssen and bassist Loek Peeters being sole constant members.

Releasing two demos and a split album in the 1990s, Inhume debuted in 2000 with the studio album, Decomposing From Inside. The band's second album, In for the Kill, was released in 2003 by the Osmose Productions.

Members

Current lineup
Loek Peeters – bass (1994–present)
Ben Janssen – guitar (1995–present)
Dorus van Ooij – vocals (2004–present)
Wiebe Otten - drums (2022-present)

Former members
Richard Ebisch – guitar (1994–1997)
Johan Dirkx – vocals (1994–2003)
Joost Silvrants – vocals (1994–2012)
Roel Sanders - drums (1994-1997, 1999-2015, 2020-2021)
Michiel Adriaans – drums (1997)
Eric de Windt – drums (1998)
Harold Gielen – guitar (1998–2007)
Dennis Schreurs - vocals (2012-2022)
Remco Verhees - drums (2015-2019)
Michiel can der Plicht - drums (2019-2020)

Timeline

Discography 
 (1995) Demo 1 demo 
 (1996) Grind Your Mind Inhume / Suppository, live split tape (boerderij geleen) 
 (1997) The Missing Limb, Demo 2 demo 
 (1997) Enjoying The Violence? Inhume / Mundo De Mierda split tape 
 (1998) Inhume / Blood Split 7" single Inhume / Blood 
 (2000) Decomposing from Inside  CD on Bones Brigade record label
 (2003) Dutch Assault split CD with Inhume, Suppository, S.M.E.S., Last Days of Humanity on Relapse Records record label
 (2003) In for the Kill CD & LP on Osmose Productions record label
 (2007) Chaos Dissection Order CD on Osmose Productions record label
 (2008) Inhume / Mumakil Split 7" single with Mumakil on Relapse Records Slimewave Series record label
 (2010) Moulding the Deformed

Sources

Metal Music Archives Biography
An Interview with the Band
2010 Album Review in German
2007 Album Review in German
2018 Compilation Album Review
Another Interview with the Band
Inhume to Release 25th Anniversary Collection in December – Metal Jacket Magazine
Allmusic biography
Album Review – Allmusic

References

External links 
Official Inhume website

Dutch death metal musical groups
Musical groups established in 1994
Dutch heavy metal musical groups
Grindcore musical groups
Musical quintets
1994 establishments in the Netherlands